The Thirteenth Man is a 1917 silent Italian drama film directed by Carmine Gallone.

Cast
 Lyda Borelli
 Ugo Piperno
 Sandro Salvini

References

External links
 

1917 films
1917 drama films
Italian drama films
Italian silent feature films
Italian black-and-white films
Films based on works by Honoré de Balzac
Films directed by Carmine Gallone
Silent drama films